Breslau is an unincorporated community in Lavaca County, Texas, in the United States.  In the year 2000 its population numbered about 65.

External links
Description in The Handbook of Texas

Unincorporated communities in Lavaca County, Texas
Unincorporated communities in Texas